Cremastobombycia solidaginis is a moth of the family Gracillariidae. It is known from Ontario and Quebec in Canada, and Florida, Texas, Georgia, Kentucky, Maine, Maryland, Massachusetts, Connecticut and Michigan in the United States.

The wingspan is 7–9 mm.

The larvae feed on Baccharis pilularis and Solidago species, including Solidago altissima, Solidago bicolor, Solidago caesia, Solidago canadensis, Solidago fistulosa, Solidago gigantea, Solidago patula and Solidago rugosa. They mine the leaves of their host plant by digging an elongated, wrinkled "mine" on the underside of the leaf. Pupation takes place within a dense white cocoon, marked with longitudinal ridges. It is suspended hammock-like within the mine, by a single silken thread at the anterior end and by two diverging threads at the posterior end. When the imago emerges the pupa case is thrust through the upper epidermis.

References

External links
mothphotographersgroup
Cremastobombycia at microleps.org

Lithocolletinae
Moths of North America
Lepidoptera of Canada
Lepidoptera of the United States
Moths described in 1876
Taxa named by Heinrich Frey
Taxa named by Jacob Boll
Leaf miners